The Castle of the Teutonic Order in Malbork is a 13th-century Teutonic castle and fortress located near the town of Malbork, Poland. It is the largest castle in the world measured by land area and a UNESCO World Heritage Site.

It was originally constructed by the Teutonic Knights, a German Catholic religious order of crusaders, in a form of an Ordensburg fortress. The Order named it Marienburg in honour of Mary, mother of Jesus. In 1457, during the Thirteen Years’ War, it was sold by Bohemian mercenaries to King Casimir IV of Poland in lieu of indemnities and it then served as one of several Polish royal residences and the seat of Polish offices and institutions, interrupted by several years of Swedish occupation, fulfilling this function until the First Partition of Poland in 1772. From then on the castle was under German rule for over 170 years until 1945, albeit largely falling into disrepair as military technological advances rendered the castle a mere historical point of interest. The construction period is a point of debate, however, most historians generally accept the 132 years between 1274 and 1406 as the construction time.

The castle is a classic example of a medieval fortress and, on its completion in 1406, was the world's largest brick castle. UNESCO designated the "Castle of the Teutonic Order in Malbork" and the Malbork Castle Museum a World Heritage Site in December 1997. It is one of two World Heritage Sites in the region (north-central Poland), together with the "Medieval Town of Toruń", which was founded in 1231.

Malbork Castle is also one of Poland's official national Historic Monuments (Pomnik historii), as designated on 16 September 1994. Its listing is maintained by the National Heritage Board of Poland.

History

Origins

The castle was built by the Teutonic Order after the conquest of Old Prussia. Its main purpose was to strengthen their own control of the area following the Order's 1274 suppression of the Great Prussian Uprising of the Baltic tribes. No contemporary documents survive relating to its construction, so instead the castle's phases have been worked out through the study of architecture and the Order's administrative records and later histories. The work lasted until around 1300, under the auspices of Commander Heinrich von Wilnowe. The castle is located on the southeastern bank of the river Nogat. It was named Marienburg after Mary, patron saint of the religious Order. The Order had been created in Acre (present-day Israel). When this last stronghold of the Crusades fell to Muslim Arabs, the Order moved its headquarters to Venice before arriving in Prussia.

Malbork became more and more important in the aftermath of the Teutonic Knights' conquest of Gdańsk (Danzig) and Eastern Pomerania in 1308. The Order's administrative centre was moved to Marienburg from Elbing (now Elbląg). The Grand Master of the Teutonic Knights, Siegfried von Feuchtwangen, who arrived in Marienburg from Venice, undertook the next phase of the fortress' construction. In 1309, in the wake of the papal persecution of the Knights Templar and the Teutonic takeover of Danzig, Feuchtwangen relocated his headquarters to the Prussian part of the Order's monastic state. He chose the site of Marienburg conveniently located on the Nogat in the Vistula Delta. As with most cities of the time, the new centre was dependent on water for transportation.

The castle was expanded several times to house the growing number of Knights. Soon, it became the largest fortified Gothic building in Europe, on a nearly  site. The castle has several subdivisions and numerous layers of defensive walls. It consists of three separate castlesthe High, Middle and Lower Castles, separated by multiple dry moats and towers. The castle once housed approximately 3,000 "brothers in arms". The outermost castle walls enclose , four times the enclosed area of Windsor Castle.

The favourable position of the castle on the river Nogat allowed easy access by barges and trading ships arriving from the Vistula and the Baltic Sea. During their governance, the Teutonic Knights collected river tolls from passing ships, as did other castles along the rivers. They controlled a monopoly on the trade of amber. When the city became a member of the Hanseatic League, many Hanseatic meetings were held there.

[[File:Castillo de Malbork, Polonia, 2013-05-19, DD 41.jpg|thumb|left|View of the High Castle (zamek wysoki) from the west]]

In 1361, the future Grand Duke of Lithuania Kęstutis was briefly imprisoned in the castle. In 1365, Polish King Casimir III the Great visited the castle.

In the summer of 1410, the castle was besieged following the Order's defeat by the armies of Władysław II Jagiełło and Vytautas the Great (Witold) at the Battle of Grunwald. Heinrich von Plauen successfully led the defence in the Siege of Marienburg (1410), during which the city outside was razed.

In 1456, during the Thirteen Years' War, the Order – facing opposition from its cities for raising taxes to pay ransoms for expenses associated with its wars against Kingdom of Poland – could no longer manage financially. Meanwhile, Polish General Stibor de Poniec of Ostoja raised funds from Danzig for a new campaign against them. Learning that the Order's Bohemian mercenaries had not been paid, Stibor convinced them to leave. He reimbursed them with money raised in Danzig. Following the departure of the mercenaries, King Casimir IV Jagiellon entered the castle in triumph in 1457, and in May, granted Danzig several privileges in gratitude for the town's assistance and involvement in the Thirteen Years' War (1454–66) as well as for the funds collected for the mercenaries that left.

The mayor of the town around the castle, Bartholomäus Blume, resisted the Polish forces for three more years, but the Poles captured and sentenced him to death in 1460. A monument to Blume was erected in 1864.

Residence of the Polish kings
In 1466 both castle and town became part of the Polish Malbork Voivodeship in the province of Royal Prussia. Since 1457 it served as one of the several Polish royal residences, fulfilling this function for over 300 years (over twice as long as it was headquarters of the Teutonic Order) until the Partitions of Poland in 1772. During this period the Tall Castle served as the castle's supply storehouse, while the Great Refectory was a place for balls, feasts, and other royal events. Polish Kings often stayed in the castle, especially when travelling to the nearby city of Gdańsk/Danzig. Local Polish officials resided in the castle. From 1568 the castle housed the Polish Admiralty (Komisja Morska) and in 1584 one of the Polish Royal Mints was established here. Also, the largest arsenal of the Polish–Lithuanian Commonwealth was located in the castle. By the decision of King John II Casimir Vasa of 1652, Jesuits took care of the castle chapels of Mary and St. Anne. 

During the Thirty Years' War, in 1626 and 1629 Swedish forces occupied the castle. They invaded and occupied it again from 1656 to 1660 during the Deluge. Then the castle was visited by Swedish kings Gustav Adolf (in 1626) and Charles X Gustav (in 1656).

After the Partitions of Poland

After Prussia and the Russian Empire made the First Partition of Poland in 1772, the town was annexed by the Kingdom of Prussia and in 1773 it became part of the newly established province of West Prussia. At that time, the officials used the rather neglected castle as a poorhouse and barracks for the Prussian Army. The last Jesuits left the castle in 1780. In 1794 David Gilly, a Prussian architect and head of the Oberbaudepartement, made a structural survey of the castle, to decide about its future use or demolition. Gilly's son, Friedrich Gilly, produced several engravings of the castle and its architecture, which he exhibited in Berlin and had published by Friedrich Frick from 1799 to 1803. These engravings led the Prussian public to "rediscover" the castle and the history of the Teutonic Knights.

Johann Dominicus Fiorillo published another edition of the engravings on 12 February 1803, also wanting to encourage public interest. Max von Schenkendorf criticized the defacement of the castle. Throughout the Napoleonic period, the army used the castle as a hospital and arsenal. Napoleon has visited the castle in 1807 and 1812. After the War of the Sixth Coalition, the castle became a symbol of Prussian history and national consciousness. Initiated by Theodor von Schön, Oberpräsident of West Prussia, in 1816, restoration of the castle was begun. In 1910 the Naval Academy Mürwik in Flensburg was built. The Marienburg was a pattern for this new Red Castle. The restoration of the Marienburg was undertaken in stages until World War II started.

With the rise of Adolf Hitler to power in the early 1930s, the Nazis used the castle as a destination for annual pilgrimages of both the Hitler Youth and the League of German Girls. The Teutonic Castle at Marienburg served as a blueprint for the Order Castles of the Third Reich built under Hitler's reign. In 1945 during World War II combat in the area, more than half the castle was destroyed.

After World War II
At the conclusion of the war, the city of Malbork and the castle became again part of Poland. The castle has been mostly reconstructed, with restoration ongoing since 1962 following a fire in 1959 which caused further damage. A significant recent restorative effort was of the main church in the castle (i.e., The Blessed Virgin Mary Church). After being restored just before World War II and then destroyed in battle, it was in a state of disrepair until a new restoration was completed in April 2016. In 1961 the Castle Museum (Muzeum Zamkowe'') was founded and in 1965 an amber exhibition was opened. Malbork Castle remains the largest brick complex in Europe.

Burials in the mausoleum under the Chapel of St. Anne

 Dietrich von Altenburg
 Heinrich Dusemer
 Winrich von Kniprode
 Konrad von Jungingen
 Michael Küchmeister von Sternberg
 Konrad von Erlichshausen

Gallery

See also
 Trakai Island Castle, similar architecture
 Castles in Poland

References
Notes

Bibliography

Further reading

External links

 Malbork Castle Museum
 "Malbork", Castles of Poland
 History and photos of the Malbork castle 
 The Association of Castles and Museums around the Baltic Sea

Art museums and galleries in Poland
Brick Gothic
Castles in Pomeranian Voivodeship
Castles of the Teutonic Knights
Decorative arts museums
Former castles in Poland
Historic house museums in Poland
History of Prussia
Museums in Pomeranian Voivodeship
Prussian cultural sites
Registered museums in Poland
Residences of Polish monarchs
Royal residences in Poland
World Heritage Sites in Poland
Buildings and structures completed in the 14th century